Security forces are statutory organizations with internal security mandates. In the legal context of several nations, the term has variously denoted police and military units working in concert, or the role of military and paramilitary forces (such as gendarmerie or military police) tasked with the internal provision of public security.

List of security forces
Examples of formally designated security forces include:

Airports Security Force of Pakistan
Afghan National Security Forces
Central Industrial Security Force of India
Central Security Forces of Egypt
Federal Security Force of Pakistan
Israeli Security Forces
Internal Security Forces of Lebanon
Iraqi Security Forces
Irish Security Forces
Kosovo Security Force
Macau Security Force
Palestinian National Security Forces
Public Security Forces of Bahrain
Puntland Security Force
Rhodesian Security Forces
RNZAF Security Forces
Security Forces Command of Northern Cyprus
Sri Lanka Civil Security Force
United States Air Force Security Forces
United States Marine Corps Security Force

See also

Public Security Force (disambiguation)

References

Government institutions
Law enforcement
Types of military forces
Political science terminology